Frederick Leverton Harris (17 December 1864 – 14 November 1926) was a British businessman and Conservative Party politician. He sat in the House of Commons for three periods between 1900 and 1918.

His role in Parliament was largely insignificant until World War I, when he used his knowledge of shipping to play a crucial role in the United Kingdom's economic warfare against the German Empire, and joined the government in 1916 in a newly created post with specific responsibility for the blockade of Germany. As the war drew to a close, his political career looked set to flourish, but was destroyed by scandal.

Early life and family 
Harris was the son of Frederick William Harris and his wife Elizabeth née Wylie, of London and Withyham, East Sussex.
His siblings included Sir Austin Edward Harris, who became a noted banker, Walter Burton Harris, a journalist, writer, traveller and socialite who achieved fame for his writings on Morocco, and pianist and composer Clement Harris, who was killed in the Greco-Turkish War of 1897.
He was educated at Winchester College and then Caius College, Cambridge, where he graduated in 1884.
The following year he became a partner in coal-factoring and ship-owning business of Harris & Dixon in London, and he later became a director of the National Discount Company and the Metropolitan Electricity Supply Company.

In 1886, he married Gertrude Richardson, from Bessbrook, County Armagh. They had no children.

Political career 

He was elected at the 1900 general election as the Member of Parliament (MP) Member of Parliament for Tynemouth, and supported the tariff reform campaign of his friend Joseph Chamberlain. He was appointed to the Tariff Reform Commission. In October 1902 he was appointed Parliamentary private secretary (unpaid) to H. O. Arnold-Forster, Parliamentary and Financial Secretary to the Admiralty.

He was defeated at the 1906 election,
but in May 1907 he was selected as the Unionist candidate for a vacancy in the Stepney division of Tower Hamlets, in London, following the resignation of Sir William Evans-Gordon.

At the by-election on 10 May, he won the seat
in a two-way contest with a Liberal-Labour candidate, Ben Cooper, Secretary of the Cigar Makers' Union. In the same year he was elected as a Municipal Reform Party candidate to the London County Council for Stepney, and was returned to Parliament by Stepney in January 1910.

For health reasons, he did not defend his seat in December 1910,
but he returned to Parliament 4 years later.  After the death of his friend Joseph Chamberlain, his son Austen Chamberlain (whose first son was Harris's godson) resigned his East Worcestershire seat to contest his father's old seat of Birmingham West.  Harris contested and won the resulting East Worcestershire by-election on 16 July,
just weeks before the outbreak of World War I. He then became a commercial adviser to the trade division of the Admiralty, and in 1916 moved to the Foreign Office as Director of the Restriction of Enemy Supplies Department. He became a privy councillor in January,
and in December he joined the government as Parliamentary Secretary to the Ministry of Blockade.

The East Worcestershire constituency was to be abolished for the 1918 general election, and Harris had been selected as the Conservative candidate for the new Moseley division of Birmingham. However, he and his wife faced public criticism for their role in wartime.
During the war, she had visited Baron Leopold von Plessen, who was interned as an alien. Von Plessen was of British-Austrian dual nationality, and his mother was a friend of Mrs Harris.  She strongly denied allegations that she had ever carried him parcels or letters for him, and was supported by Austen Chamberlain, who also defended her husband against suggestions that his business had profited from his role in government.
However, Harris feared that the election would be fought on personal grounds, and on 16 October he withdrew his candidacy. When the war ended he withdrew from public life.

Retirement 
Harris had lived at Camilla Lacey near Dorking in Surrey, but the house burned down in 1914. In about 1920 he took up painting, and in 1925 exhibited 50 oil paintings at the Goupil Gallery.

He died suddenly on 14 November 1926 at his home in Grosvenor Street, London, aged 61.

References

External links 
 
 

1864 births
1926 deaths
People educated at Winchester College
Alumni of Gonville and Caius College, Cambridge
British businesspeople in shipping
Conservative Party (UK) MPs for English constituencies
UK MPs 1900–1906
UK MPs 1906–1910
UK MPs 1910
UK MPs 1910–1918
Members of the Privy Council of the United Kingdom
Members of London County Council
Municipal Reform Party politicians